Indre Sula is a mountain in the municipality of Surnadal in Møre og Romsdal county, Norway.  It is part of the Trollheimen mountain range, and it lies just north of the village of Todalsøra and the Todalsfjorden.

Indre Sula, meaning "Inner Sula", lies next to Ytre Sula, meaning "Outer Sula". The route from Indre Sula to Ytre Sula is scrambling.

References

Mountains of Møre og Romsdal
Surnadal